This is a list of ambassadors of the United States to the Democratic Republic of the Congo.

From 1877 until 1960, the republic had been a colony of Belgium, first under the name Congo Free State and then Belgian Congo.

The Congo was granted its independence on June 30, 1960, adopting the name “Republic of the Congo” (République du Congo). As the French colony of Middle Congo (Moyen-Congo) also chose the name Republic of Congo upon receiving its independence, the two countries were more commonly known as Congo-Léopoldville and Congo-Brazzaville, after their capital cities.

The United States immediately recognized the new Republic of the Congo and moved to establish diplomatic relations. The embassy in Léopoldville (now Kinshasa) was established on June 30, 1960, with John D. Tomlinson as Chargé d'Affaires ad interim. The first ambassador, Clare H. Timberlake was appointed on July 5, 1960.

In 1971, President Joseph-Désiré Mobutu changed the country’s official name to Zaire.

In 1997, President Laurent Kabila restored the name "Democratic Republic of the Congo", previously used from 1964 to 1971.

Ambassadors

Notes

See also
Democratic Republic of the Congo – United States relations
Foreign relations of the Democratic Republic of the Congo
Ambassadors from the United States

References
United States Department of State: Background notes on the Democratic Republic of Congo

External links
 United States Department of State: Chiefs of Mission for the Democratic Republic of Congo
 United States Department of State: Democratic Republic of the Congo
 United States Embassy in Kinshasa

Congo, Democratic Republic
United States
Main